Heinrich Rieger (25 December 1868 in Sereď, Austria-Hungary – 17 October 1942 in the Theresienstadt ghetto) was an Austrian dentist whose art collection was one of the most important in Austrian modern art. Rieger and his wife were murdered in the Holocaust.

Life

Education and early years 
Rieger was the son of Philipp and Eva Rieger, née Schulhof. He was born in Sereď an der Waag in the administrative district of Pressburg (now Bratislava), which at that time belonged to the Hungarian half of the empire. After graduating from the “Reformed Obergymnasium” in Budapest in 1885, Rieger studied medicine in Vienna. On 10 December 1892 he received his doctorate in medicine and began work as a resident dentist in Vienna. At the age of 25, Heinrich Rieger married 23-year-old Bertha Klug, daughter of a café owner, in Sereď on 30 May 1893. The couple had three children. On 28 March 1901, Rieger acquired a villa in Gablitz, in which he also practiced.

The Rieger Collection 

Rieger began collecting contemporary works of art around 1900. He often accepted works of art from penniless artists instead of money as payment for dental treatments. This brought him into contact with young artists such as Egon Schiele and Oskar Kokoschka, who were then living in Vienna, and became their sponsor. This is how the core of his collection came into being. Through further acquisitions, Rieger's collection became one of the most important of Austrian modern art alongside the Oskar Reichert collection. During the First World War, Rieger acquired over 120 works. In the years up to 1921, the inventory grew again by more than 250 works by young painters such as Käthe Kollwitz, Anton Faistauer, Karl Sterrer, Albin Egger-Lienz, Liebermann and Franz Stuck.

Rieger collected many works by Egon Schiele whose first fifty drawings came into Rieger's ownership between 1915 and 1918 - most of the oil paintings, such as the work "Cardinal and Nun" or "The Embrace", in 1918. In 1921, Rieger owned twelve oil paintings by Schiele initially housed in Rieger's private rooms in Vienna, in his practice rooms and in his villa in Gablitz, Linzerstr. 99, open to a limited public only.

Artworks in Rieger's collection are known from a surviving insurance list from 1935 and another list created for the autumn exhibition of the "Cooperative of Visual Artists Vienna" in the Künstlerhaus Vienna, which opened on 9 November 1935. The latter list showed that Rieger had loaned around 200 works of art, including Schiele's oil painting "Cardinal and Nun".

At the World Exhibition in Paris in 1937, four Schiele works from Rieger's collection were shown as part of an exhibition of Austrian art in the Galerie nationale du Jeu de Paume.

Before March 1938, the collection should have included around 120 to 150 drawings by Schiele.

Anschluss and Nazi persecution 
After the 13 March 1938 Anschluss with Nazi Germany, Rieger was persecuted because he was Jewish.

Special anti-Jewish laws forced Austrian Jews like Rieger to declare their assets, in preparation for the seizure of their property. Rieger's art collection was assessed by Bruno Grimschitz, a Nazi who was  Deputy Director and Acting Director of the Österreichische Galerie Belvedere in Vienna. However, the Grimschitz list of estimates of the collection, which was assumed to contain around 800 objects at the time, has been lost to this day.

With the “Fourth Ordinance to the Reich Citizenship Law” of 31 July 1938,  Jews were forced out of the medical profession on 31 August 1938. Forbidden to practice medicine because he was Jewish, and impoverished by the confiscation of property and the Nazi's anti-Jewish fees and penalties, Rieger was forced to sell artworks in November 1938.

Before being murdered by the Nazis, Rieger sold a total of twenty-six works, including Schiele's “Embrace” and “Cardinal and Nun” as well as Josef Dobrowsky's “Arms in the Spirit”, to the Nazi art dealer Friedrich Welz in 1939 and 1940, respectively. Another large part of the Rieger collection was acquired in March 1941 by the Austrian graphic artist Luigi Kasimir, who, together with Ernst Edhoffer, ran an art shop in Vienna that had emerged from the aryanized art dealership Gall and Goldmann owned by Elsa Gall. Kasimir sold around twenty works from the Rieger Collection during the war years. Further works were found in Kasimir's private apartment in 1947. Both Welz and Kasimir paid amounts for the pictures that were well below the market value of the works of art. The sale to Kasimir was apparently based on the values estimated by Grimschitz. After the end of the war, both had to answer for the acquisition of the Rieger Collection due to § 6 KVG, “improper enrichment” (“Aryanization”). However, the proceedings against Welz ended with an out-of-court settlement, while Kasimir was acquitted because he had recognized all restitution claims. At least some of the works were returned to Robert Rieger, who lived in the USA as his father's legal successor, after the proceedings.

The Rieger Collection was thus dismantled. However, some of Egon Schiele's drawings from the Rieger Collection are still lost.

Deportation 
On 24 September 1942, the Nazis deported Rieger and his wife to the Theresienstadt ghetto on the 42nd transport. After initiating a death declaration procedure, it was established on 7 March 1947 that Heinrich Rieger had been murdered there on 17 October 1942, although specifics remained unclear. Berta Rieger was deported from Theresienstadt to Auschwitz in 1944, where she was murdered immediately upon arrival. The Nazi Riech seized the Riegers' assets in accordance with the “Ordinance on the Confiscation of Assets Hostile to the People and the State in Austria” of 18 November 1938.

Family 
Rieger's son Ludwig (1894–1913) and the third-born daughter Antonia (1897–1933) died through suicide. Their son Robert (1894–1985) became a doctor, emigrated to the USA in 1938 and was the legal successor to his father's art collection.

Claims for Nazi-looted art 
The Rieger family have successfully filed restitution claims for artworks by Egon Schiele that were seized by the Nazis; many of the claims involved long and difficult court battles and commissions.

In 2002 the Israelitische Kultusgemeinde Wein requested that the Austrian police seize  Wayside Shrine (1907) by Egon Schiele saying that had been looted from the Rieger collection.

In 2016 Rieger's heirs filed suit against Robert “Robin” Owen Lehman for Schiele's Portrait of the Artist’s Wife (1917). The heirs of  Karl Maylaender also filed suit against Lehman. Lehman then sued both families.

In 2021 Schiele’s Kauernder weiblicher Akt (Crouching Female Nude) was restituted to the Rieger family. It had been in the collection of the Museum Ludwig since 1976.

Literature 

 Michael Wladika: Dossier Dr. Heinrich Rieger. Provenienzforschung im Auftrag des Leopold Museums. Dezember 2009. Seiten 17f. (online)

See also 

 The Holocaust in Austria
 List of claims for restitution for Nazi-looted art
 Portrait of Wally
 Aryanization

References

External links 
 
 Stichwortartiger Lebenslauf Riegers auf der Web-Site Lost Art des Deutschen Zentrums für Kulturgutverluste (online)

1868 births
1942 deaths
Austrian art collectors
Austrian dentists
People from Vienna
Austrian people who died in the Theresienstadt Ghetto
Jewish art collectors
Subjects of Nazi art appropriations
Art and cultural repatriation after World War II